Ouidah or Whydah (Ouidah, Juida, and Juda by the French; Ajudá by the Portuguese; and Fida by the Dutch) and known locally as Glexwe, formerly the chief port of the Kingdom of Whydah, is a city on the coast of the Republic of Benin.

History
In local tradition Kpassa is supposed to have founded the town. This probably happened towards the end of the sixteenth century. The town was originally known as Glēxwé, literally 'Farmhouse', and was part of the Kingdom of Whydah.

Ouidah saw its role in international trade rise when the Royal African Company (RAC) constructed a fort there in 1650.

Whydah troops pushed their way into the African interior, capturing millions of people through wars, and selling them to European and Arab slave traders. By 1716, the Kingdom of Whydah had become the second largest slave port in the triangular trade, as noted by the crew of the slave ship Whydah Gally when it arrived to purchase 500 slaves from King Haffon to sell in Jamaica.

The Kingdom was ruled by King Haffon, who received his coronation crown as a gift from Portugal, until, in 1727, the Kingdom of Whydah was captured by the forces of King Agaja of Dahomey. On 19 March 1727, The Boston News-Letter gave this report:

In 1860, Whydah was the port that sent the last recorded shipment of slaves to the United States, even though that country had prohibited the transatlantic slave trade in 1808. This illegal shipment was aboard the Clotilda and went to Mobile, Alabama.

France captured the town in 1894, by which time the town had declined due to the outlawing of the slave trade. In the time frame of 1946–1949 French government estimates put the population of Ouidah at about 14,600. By then it had a railway. It was a centre for production and trade in palm kernels, palm oil, copra, coffee, manioc, beans, tomatoes and onions. It was also a centre of the fish trade and the manufacture of vegetable oil. It had Catholic, Protestant and Muslim places of worship.

Fort of São João Baptista de Ajudá

The Fort of São João Baptista de Ajudá (in English Fort of St John the Baptist of Ouidah) is a small fortress built by the Portuguese in Ouidah on the coast of Dahomey (originally Ajudá, from Hweda, on the Atlantic coast of modern Benin), reached by the Portuguese in 1580, after which it grew around the slave trade, for which the Slave Coast was already renowned. In 1680 the Portuguese governor of São Tomé and Príncipe was authorized to erect a fort but nothing was done and it was only in 1721 that construction of the fort, which was named Fort of São João Baptista de Ajudá, started. The fort, built on land given to Portugal by King Haffon of Whydah, remained under Portuguese control from 1721 until 1961.

Population
The population evolution of Ouidah is as follows:

Notable landmarks

Attractions in Ouidah include a restored mansion of Brazilian slavers (the Maison du Brésil), a Vodun python temple, an early twentieth century basilica and the Sacred Forest of Kpasse, dotted with bronze statues.

The Route des Esclaves, by which slaves were taken to the beach, has numerous statues and monuments, including the Door of No Return, a memorial arch.

The Market Center of Ouidah, which was established by Scouts more than 20 years ago, trains young people in agricultural skills, thus helping to reverse the exodus towards the cities.

Ouidah is often considered the spiritual capital of the Vodun religion, and hosts an annual international Vodun conference.

Other landmarks include:
 Basilique de l'Immaculée Conception
 Ouidah Museum of History
 Zinsou Foundation Museum

World Heritage Status
This site was added to the UNESCO World Heritage Tentative List on 31 October 1996 in the Cultural category.

Notable people
Redoshi (d. 1937), and Matilda McCrear (d, 1940), last known survivors of the Transatlantic slave trade
 Patrice Talon (1958), president of Benin
 Angélique Kidjo (1960), singer 
 Oscar Olou (1987), footballer

See also
 Heads of State of Benin
 Heads of Government of Benin
 Whydah Gally

References

 WorldStatesmen- Benin not quite worked in yet
 La ville d'Ouidah : quartiers anciens et Route de l'Esclave – UNESCO World Heritage Centre

External links

 Door of No Return

 
Communes of Benin
Populated places in Benin
Portuguese forts
Populated places established in the 16th century
Capitals of former nations
Portuguese colonisation in Africa
Former enclaves
Former Portuguese colonies